Several ships of the Royal Navy have been named HMS Dragon.
 , a ship of 100 tons built in 1512 under Sir William Sidney in the war with France. Last mentioned 1514.
 , a 140-ton three-masted ship depicted in the Anthony Roll of 1546. Built 1542 or 1544 and rebuilt 1551. Last mentioned 1553 
  (or Red Dragon), a galleon built in 1593 and last mentioned 1613.
 , a fourth-rate frigate launched in 1647, rebuilt in 1690 and 1707 and wrecked in 1711.
 , a 50-gun fourth-rate ship of the line launched in 1711, renamed HMS Dragon in 1715, and broken up in 1733.
 , a 60-gun fourth-rate ship of the line launched in 1736, and scuttled as a breakwater in 1757.
 , a 74-gun third-rate ship of the line built in 1760 and sold in 1784.
 , a 74-gun third-rate ship of the line built in 1798 at Rotherhithe. Refitted in 1814, she served until 1815. She was broken up in 1850.
 , a 6-gun wooden paddle second-rate frigate built in 1845 and sold 1865, designed by Sir William Symonds, which served in the Baltic during the Crimean War.
 , a 6-gun  screw sloop launched in 1878 and sold in 1892.
 , a twin-screw  torpedo boat destroyer launched in 1894 and sold in 1912.
  was a stone frigate of the Royal Naval Reserve in Swansea and acted as a Communications Training Centre. She was decommissioned in 1994.
 , is a Type 45 destroyer launched in November 2008

Battle honours
Ships named Dragon have earned the following battle honours:

Kentish Knock, 1652
Portland, 1653
Gabbard, 1653
Scheveningen, 1653
Lowestoft, 1665
Four Days' Battle, 1666
Orfordness, 1666
Bugia, 1671
Barfleur, 1692
Belle Isle, 1761
Martinique, 1762
Havana, 1762
Egypt, 1801
Baltic, 1854–55
Arctic, 1944

References
Citations

References
 

Royal Navy ship names